Walter Hungerford may refer to several Englishmen:
Walter Hungerford, 1st Baron Hungerford (1378–1449), Knight of the Garter, nobleman and Speaker of the House of Commons
Walter Hungerford, 1st Baron Hungerford of Heytesbury (1503–1540), the first person in England to be executed under the Buggery Act of 1533
Sir Walter Hungerford of Farleigh (died 1516), fought for Henry VII at the Battle of Bosworth Field, and served on the Privy Council for both Henry VII and Henry VIII
Sir Walter Hungerford (Knight of Farley) (1532–1596), landowner, called "the Knight of Farley" for his sporting abilities
Walter Hungerford (MP) (1675–1754), landowner and MP for Calne